Odin By Farstad (born 1 December 1997) is a Norwegian speed skater.

He won a medal at the 2020 World Single Distances Speed Skating Championships.

References

External links

1997 births
Living people
Norwegian male speed skaters
People from Malvik
World Single Distances Speed Skating Championships medalists
Sportspeople from Trøndelag